The women's beach soccer tournament at the 2019 World Beach Games in Doha, Qatar, the inaugural edition of the ANOC World Beach Games, took place over six days from 11–16 October. Along with the men's tournament, the two events comprised the beach soccer competition at this year's Games. 

Organised by the Association of National Olympic Committees (ANOC), national associations of FIFA (beach soccer's governing body) from a territory with a National Olympic Committee (NOC) were invited to enter one team into preliminary qualification routes from which eight teams, representing four continental zones, advanced to the final competition; the hosts Qatar did not enter a team.

The tournament was a multi-stage competition, consisting of a round-robin group stage and followed by a single elimination knockout round, starting with the semi-finals and ending with the gold medal match, with all matches hosted on the Katara Beach.

The gold and silver medals were won by Spain and Great Britain respectively, with the former defeating the latter in the final 3–2. The bronze medal was claimed by Brazil who beat Russia in the deciding match.

Competition schedule
The tournament began on 11 October, one day before the opening ceremony, and ended on the final day of the Games, 16 October. 

Matches deciding medal winners took place exclusively on 16 October.

Qualified teams

With the exception of UEFA, the six continental zones of FIFA were each originally allocated one berth at the Games. However, neither the Asian Football Confederation (AFC) nor Oceania Football Confederation (OFC) ultimately entered any teams (China were due to enter a team as the AFC representative but withdrew). Therefore, these two vacant berths were redistributed, with CONMEBOL and CONCACAF each receiving one extra berth. 

The following teams qualified from their zones via regional preliminary tournaments or invitation (hosts Qatar were eligible to enter a team automatically however declined to enter):

a. Competed in qualification as England. England does not have an independent NOC and is instead represented by Great Britain at Olympic events.
b. The dates of teams who qualified via invitation refer to when they were publicly revealed by the qualification organisers.

Venues

The matches were held on the Katara Beach at the Beach Soccer Arena which consisted of two venues: the larger-capacity main stadium that hosted the majority of games and located adjacent, a smaller-capacity secondary stadium known as "Pitch 1" for all other matches which was only used during the group stage.

Squads

Each team could enter a squad consisting of up to 10 players. A total of up to 80 athletes were expected to compete.

Draw
The draw to split the eight teams into two groups of four took place at 10:00 AST (UTC+3) on 27 August 2019 at the Lusail Sports Arena in Doha, Qatar. Beach Soccer Worldwide (BSWW) vice-president Joan Cusco oversaw the draw.

For the purpose of the draw, the eight teams were split into two pots of four. Two teams from each pot were drawn into each group. Teams from the same confederation could not be drawn into the same group, except for UEFA nations for which one group was permitted to contain two. At the start of the draw, two teams from Pot 1 were automatically allocated to the groups – Spain (European ranking leaders), were assigned to position A1 and Great Britain, (European ranking deputy leaders (as England)), were assigned to position B1.

The composition of the pots is shown below:

Group stage
Four of the eight nations, the winners and runners-up of each group, advance to the knockout stage.

All times are local, AST (UTC+3).

Group A

Group B

Knockout stage

Semi-finals

Bronze medal match

Gold medal match

Top goalscorers
Players with at least three goals are listed

7 goals

 Carmen Fresneda

6 goals

 Sarah Kempson
 Alba Mellado

5 goals

 Nayara Couto
 Natalie Barboza
 Carolina Gonzalez

4 goals

 Marisol Luna
 Gemma Hillier
 Fanny Godoy
 Anna Cherniakova
 Wendy Martin
 Lorena Medeiros

3 goals

 Jennifer Mora
 Esli Sanchez
 Vanda Delgado Graça
 Jasna Continentino
 Natalia Zaitseva
 Molly Clark
 Adriele Rocha
 Andrea Miron
 Jessica Miras

Source: BSRussia

Final standings

See also
Beach soccer at the 2019 World Beach Games – Men's tournament

References

External links
Beach Soccer, at ANOC World Beach Games Qatar (official website)
World Beach Games 2019, at Beach Soccer Worldwide
World Beach Games – Women's tournament, at Beach Soccer Russia (in Russian)

Women's